Person to Person is a solo album by pianist George Cables recorded in 1995 and released on the Danish label, SteepleChase.

Reception 

Ken Dryden of AllMusic stated "This 1995 session for Steeplechase is one of the rare times where he had a chance to record as a solo pianist". The Penguin Guide to Jazz described the album as "an immaculate solo performance that has melody at a premium and never for a moment drifts off into chordal side-roads."

Track listing 
All compositions by George Cables except where noted.
 "My Funny Valentine" (Richard Rodgers, Lorenz Hart) – 6:16
 "I Told You So" – 3:29
 "Sweet Rita Suite" – 9:12
 "Blue Nights" – 5:37
 "A Foggy Day" (George Gershwin, Ira Gershwin) – 4:36
 "I Remember Clifford" (Benny Golson) – 5:36
 "On Green Dolphin Street" (Bronisław Kaper, Ned Washington) – 3:26
 "Love Song" – 5:41
 "In a Sentimental Mood" (Duke Ellington) – 3:56
 "In Walked Bud" (Thelonious Monk) – 3:24
 "Polka Dots and Moonbeams" (Jimmy Van Heusen) – 4:57
 "Body and Soul" (Johnny Green) – 6:10

Personnel 
George Cables – piano

References 

1995 albums
George Cables albums
Solo piano jazz albums
SteepleChase Records albums